Lamprodermataceae is a family of slime molds in the order Physarales.

Genera
The family contains the following five genera:
Collaria Nann.-Bremek
Colloderma G. Lister
Diacheopsis Meyl.
Elaeomyxa Hagelst.
Lamproderma Rostaf.

References

Myxogastria
Amoebozoa families